Buccinum baerii, common name Baer's buccinum, is a species of sea snail, a marine gastropod mollusk in the family Buccinidae, the true whelks. The epithet is written by some authors as "baeri".

Description
The size of an adult shell varies between 25 mm and 54 mm. The thin shell has an elongate to ovate shape with a large broad, convex body whorl. The conical spire is pointed. There are numerous, rounded spiral cords on the whorls; but they may be hard to see. In some specimens, the cords are large with occasional low and broad axial ribs. The presence or absence of sculpture in this species is an individual character and is not based on a geographic location. The broad ovalaperture points upwards. The siphonal canal is short and broad. The columella and the parietal wall are curved showing a thin, yellowish-white callus. The horny operculum is small and oval. The color of the shell varies between yellowish-brown and purplish-gray.

Baer's buccinum is host to larval stages of trematodes.

The hermit crab Pagurus hirsutiusculus (Dana, 1851) can be found in empty shells of Baer's buccinum.

Distribution
This cold-water species occurs on rocky shores, sand or gravel in the intertidal zone to depths of 15m.  in the Bering Sea and Aleutian Islands to Kodiak, Alaska

References

 The National Audubon Society - Field Guide to North American Shells, p. 549;

External links
 

Buccinidae
Gastropods described in 1848